The Indira Gandhi Paryavaran Puraskar (Hindi: इंदिरा गांधी पर्यावरण पुरस्कार) is an environment award given for contributions in the field of environmental protection. The award was established in 1987 by the Ministry of Environment, Forests, and Climate Change, Government of India. A cash prize, silver lotus trophy, scroll, and a citation are included in the award. The selection of any organization or personality for the award is done by a committee headed by the Vice President of India. In 2008, the award was given to Isha Foundation of Tamil Nadu. This organization has a Guinness world record for planting more than eight lakh saplings in a single day.

Nomination 
The award is given every year and an advertisement for inviting nominations for IGPP is released every year on 15 July in national dailies with regional coverage. As per the amended regulations in 2010 governing the IGPP Indira Gandhi Paryavaran Puraskar, the following can propose a name of any such person or organization in India: any Indian citizen with at least 10 years of work experience in the field of environment, an NGO working in the field of environment with at least five years of experience, the Department of Environment and Forestry of States, Union Territories, State Pollution Control Board, District Collector, and Magistrate.

List of awards

See also 

 List of environmental awards
 Indira Priyadarshini Vrikshamitra Awards

References 

Indian awards
Monuments and memorials to Indira Gandhi